John H. Kramer (born 1943) is an American criminologist. He is an emeritus professor of sociology and criminology at Pennsylvania State University (Penn State), where he was a professor from 1973 until his retirement in 2015. He also served as executive director of the Pennsylvania Commission on Sentencing from 1979 to 1998, and as staff director for the United States Sentencing Commission from 1996 to 1998.

Education
Kramer received his Ph.D. in sociology from the University of Iowa.

Honors and awards
In 2014, Kramer received the Justice Policy Innovator Award from the Academy of Criminal Justice Sciences. In 2016, the John Kramer Professorship in Criminology was created in his honor at the Penn State College of the Liberal Arts. Also in 2016, he received the American Society of Criminology's Lifetime Achievement Award.

References

External links
Kramer's faculty page

Living people
1943 births
American criminologists
Pennsylvania State University faculty
University of Iowa alumni